Aaravalli Sooravalli is a 1946 Indian, Tamil language film directed by C. V. Raman. The film stars K. Thavamani Devi, V. A. Chellappa, P. S. Govinda, M. R. Santhanalakshmi and Serukulathur Sama.

Plot
Aaravalli and Sooravalli are two sisters who rule a Kingdom and establish a matriarchal society. Both of them have magical power. The king of the neighbouring country challenges them. The story deals with how he brings the sisters under his power.

Cast
The list is adapted from the song book:

Male cast
 Serukulathur Sama as Dharmar
 V. A. Chellappa as Paramasivan
 P. S. Govindan as Allimuthu
 R. Balasubramaniam as Bheeman
 Nagarcoil Mahadevan as Naradar
 V. S. Mani as Abhimanyu
 T. B. Harihara Bhagavathar as Shri Krishnan
 V. S. Krishnamoorthi as Sahadevan
 Kali N. Rathnam as Vichithran
 T. S. Durairaj as Ponnan
 Kolathu Mani, Ezhumalai,Radha, N. R. S. Iyer as Comedy Actors 

Female cast
 P. S. Sivabhagyam as Aaravalli
 C. T. Rajakantham as Sooravalli
 M. R. Santhanalakshmi as Sangavathi
 K. Thavamani Devi as Alankari
 T. S. Jaya, P. Leela Bayi,Gnanambal as Aaravalli's Sisters
 S. R. Janaki

Production
The film was produced by Southern Theatres and was directed by C. V. Raman. G. S. Bhagavathar wrote the screenplay and dialogues.

Soundtrack
Music was composed by G. Ramanathan and the lyrics were penned by Papanasam Sivan and G. S. Bhagavathar. Singers were V. A. Chellappa, Kali N. Rathnam, K. Thavamani Devi and T. S. Durairaj.

Aambale Un Maele - T. S. Durairaj, K. Thavamani Devi

References

1940s Tamil-language films
Films based on Indian folklore
Films scored by G. Ramanathan
Indian black-and-white films